The 1997 Indiana Hoosiers football team represented Indiana University Bloomington during the 1997 Big Ten Conference football season. They participated as members of the Big Ten Conference. The Hoosiers played their home games in Memorial Stadium in Bloomington, Indiana. The team was coached by Cam Cameron in his first year as head coach.

Schedule

1998 NFL draftees

References

Indiana
Indiana Hoosiers football seasons
Indiana Hoosiers football